Res Septimo Cortez (born January 4, 1956), better known as Rez Cortez, is a Filipino film and television actor and assistant director.

Acting career
Cortez's film career began in 1974, when he was introduced in Daigdig ng Sindak at Lagim.

He is also known for being an action star in many action films with his intensive and antagonistic roles and also in TV series.

He is become an assistant director of the movie Kapag Lumaban ang Api in 1987.

He became the president of the Mowelfund (Movie Workers Foundation, Inc.) after Boots Anson-Roa retired on April 1, 2020. He was a former president of the Actors’ Guild of the Philippines and was replaced by Imelda Papin in 2017.

Cortez also ran as a Representative of Camarines Sur in 2013 but did not win the seat.

Filmography

Film

Television

Awards and nominations

References

External links

1956 births
Living people
Bicolano actors
Bicolano people
Filipino male dancers
Male actors from Camarines Sur
ABS-CBN personalities
GMA Network personalities
TV5 (Philippine TV network) personalities